"All Glory, Laud and Honour" is an English translation by the Anglican clergyman John Mason Neale of the Latin hymn "Gloria, laus et honor", which was written by Theodulf of Orléans in 820. It is a Palm Sunday hymn, based on Matthew 21:1–11 and the occasion of Christ's triumphal entry into Jerusalem.

History 
Theodulf became the Bishop of Orléans under Charlemagne. When Charlemagne died and Louis the Pious became the emperor of the Holy Roman Empire, Theodulf was removed from the bishopric and placed under house arrest at a monastery in Angers during the power struggle following Louis' ascension, mostly due to his opposition to icons and Louis' suspicion that Theodulf supported an Italian rival to the throne. During his arrest, Theodulf wrote "Gloria, laus et honor" for Palm Sunday. Although likely apocryphal, a 16th-century story asserted that Louis heard Theodulf sing "Gloria, laus et honor" one Palm Sunday, and was so inspired that he released Theodulf and ordered that the hymn be sung thereafter on every Palm Sunday.

A translation into Middle English was effected by William Herebert: "Wele, herying and worshipe be to Christ that dere ous boughte,/ To wham gradden 'Osanna' children clene of thoughte."

In 1851, John Mason Neale translated the hymn from Latin into English to be published in his Medieval Hymns and Sequences. Neale revised his translation in 1854 and revised it further in 1861 when it was published in the first edition of Hymns Ancient and Modern.

The hymn was originally made of thirty-nine verses however only the first twelve lines were sung since a ninth-century published manuscript attributed to St. Gall until Neale's translation. The original Latin words are used by Roman Catholics alongside the English translation.

Text
Neale's hymn appears as Number 86 in Hymns Ancient and Modern in a version with six stanzas, using the first four lines as the refrain, which is repeated between each stanza. The original Latin stanzas were more numerous, but
although they were translated by Neale, many are not sung nowadays, including one which was omitted for "evident reasons", the first two lines reading "Be Thou, O Lord, the Rider,/ And we the little ass;". The hymn's principal theme is praising Christ's triumphal entry into Jerusalem, as evident in the refrain, and it is usually sung for Palm Sunday.

Tune
The commonly used tune of the hymn, titled "St. Theodulf" or originally "", was composed in 1603 by Melchior Teschner. The following harmonisation is from Johann Sebastian Bach, as it appears in the New English Hymnal:

In popular culture 
In 1967, the hymn was covered by British singer Sir Cliff Richard on his Good News album.

References

External links
 , sung by the Choir of King's College, Cambridge

English Christian hymns
Cliff Richard songs
9th-century Christianity
Palm Sunday hymns
Hymns in The English Hymnal